Pico da Pedra is a civil parish in the municipality of Ribeira Grande in the Portuguese archipelago of the Azores. The population in 2011 was 2,909, in an area of 6.58 km².

History

The settlement of the area began at the beginning of the 16th century.

The origin of its name derives from the 234 metre mountain in the south of the settlement, a volcanic cone that first encountered during the exploration of the island, and which scattered basaltic lava in its surroundings.

It was only in the 20th century that the parish developed initiatives to improve the quality of life in Pico da Pedra, which included the establishment of social centre, cooperative for habitation and consume, sports fields, a Casa do Povo, daycare and seniors centres, and informative services.

Geography
Pico da Pedra is a landlocked parish situated in the interior of the northern coast of the island of São Miguel, approximately eight kilometres away from the town of Ponta Delgada and ten kilometres from municipal seat of Ribeira Grande. It is surrounded in the north and west by the parishes of Calhetas and Fenais da Luz, south by Fajã de Cima, São Roque and Livramento and east by the parish of Rabo de Peixe.
 
It contains the localities Cancela, Pico da Pedra, Pico do Ataíde, Pico do Boi, Tapada do Fernandes and Tronqueira. The population of the parish hovers around 3000 residents. The growth of pedestrianism on the islands of the Azores was the impetus for the creation of the ecological association Amigos dos Açores, whose headquarters is located in Pico da Pedra.

Economy
Over that last decades of the 20th century, the population of Pico da Pedra transformed from a typically rural population, dedicated to agriculture, into a population dedicated to essentially serviced-based activities, employed primarily in the city of Ponta Delgada.

References

External links
 Amigos dos Açores Official Website

Parishes of Ribeira Grande, Azores